Baisesaurus (meaning "Baise lizard") is an extinct genus of ichthyosauromorph from the early Triassic (Spathian) Luolou Formation of Guangxi, China. The genus contains a single species, B. robustus, known from a partial postcranial skeleton.

Discovery and naming 
The Baisesaurus holotype specimen, CUGW VH107, was discovered in 2018 in a layer of the Luolou Formation in the Nanpanjiang Basin of Zhebao Township, Longlin County, Baise, Guangxi region, China. The specimen consists of assorted ribs, gastralia, a limb element (likely a radius), 12 vertebral centra, and seven neural arches.

In 2022, Ren et al. described Baisesaurus robustus, a new genus and species of basal ichthyosauromorph. The generic name, "Baisesaurus", combines a reference to the type locality in Baise, China, with the Greek "saurus", meaning "lizard". The specific name, "robustus", means "robust".

Description 
It was more similar to Utatsusaurus than to any other ichthyosauromorph, with similar size and anatomical traits. It can be inferred from related animals that Baisesaurus was a strong swimmer with long, compact forelimb bones.

Classification 
Baisesaurus likely represents a basal member of the clade Ichthyosauromorpha. The describing authors explain that it may represent a member of the Ichthyopterygia. However, such a classification is highly tentative.

References 

Sauropsida
Fossil taxa described in 2022
Triassic reptiles of Asia
Ichthyosauromorph genera
Triassic ichthyosauromorphs
Paleontology in Guangxi